Paidia rica is a moth of the family Erebidae. It was described by Christian Friedrich Freyer in 1858. It is found in southern and central Europe.

The wingspan is 28–33 mm. Adults have been recorded on wing from June to August in one generation per year.

The larvae feed on algae (including Pleurococcus species) and lichen.

Subspecies
Paidia rica rica
Paidia rica fuliginosa Reisser, 1928

References

Nudariina
Moths described in 1858
Moths of Europe
Taxa named by Christian Friedrich Freyer